In mathematics, Al-Salam polynomials, named for Waleed Al Salam, may refer to: 
Al-Salam–Carlitz polynomials
Al-Salam–Chihara polynomials
Al-Salam–Ismail polynomials